Fexofenadine/pseudoephedrine, sold under the brand name Allegra-D among others, is a fixed-dose combination medication used for the treatment of nasal congestion and other symptoms of allergies and the common cold. It contains fexofenadine, as the hydrochloride, an antihistamine; and pseudoephedrine, as the hydrochloride, a nasal decongestant.

In 2020, it was the 381st most commonly prescribed medication in the United States, with more than 300thousand prescriptions.

References

External links 
 
 

Combination drugs
Decongestants
Sanofi